The Swiss national roller hockey team is the national team side of Switzerland at international roller hockey. Usually it takes part in the FIRS Roller Hockey World Cup and CERH European Roller Hockey Championship.

Swiss squad - 50th Euro Cup

References

External links
Official website of Swiss Roller Hockey Federation

National Roller Hockey Team
Roller hockey
S